Regency House is a grade II* listed house at 7 Church Street in Framlingham, Suffolk, England. The house is timber-framed, of three storeys, and dates from the early nineteenth century. It is in use as a shop and house.

References 

Grade II* listed buildings in Suffolk
Grade II* listed houses
Timber framed buildings in Suffolk
Framlingham